The sixth edition of the Pan Pacific Swimming Championships, a long course (50 m) event involving countries in the Pacific region, was held in 1995 in Atlanta, Georgia, United States, from August 10–13.

The meet served as the swimming test event for the 1996 Olympics.

Competing nations

Results

Men's events

Legend:

Women's events

Legend:

See also
List of Pan Pacific Championships records in swimming

References
For the Record, Swimming World Magazine, October 1995.

 
Pan Pacific Swimming Championships
P
Pan Pacific Swimming Championships
International aquatics competitions hosted by the United States
Swimming competitions in the United States
Swimming in Georgia (U.S. state)
Pan Pacific
Sports competitions in Georgia (U.S. state)